Hokksund Station is located in the village of Hokksund in Øvre Eiker, Norway on the Sørlandet Line. The station is served by local trains between Kongsberg via Oslo to Eidsvoll operated by the Vy as well as express trains from Oslo to Bergen and Kristiansand.

History
The station was opened in 1866 as part of Randsfjorden Line. In 1971 it became terminus of the branch line between Hokksund and Kongsberg.

Railway stations in Øvre Eiker
Railway stations on the Randsfjorden Line
Railway stations on the Sørlandet Line
Railway stations opened in 1866
1866 establishments in Norway